Flute Australia Volume 2 is an album by Geoffrey Collins and David Miller. Released in 1988 it is the second in a series put out by 2MBS-FM. It features a series of works from different composers performed by David Miller on piano and Geoffrey Collins on flute. It was nominated for the 1990 ARIA Award for Best Classical Album.

Track listing
Sonata (for flute and piano) / Richard Meale
Evanston Song / Nigel Butterley
Songs of Sea and Sky / Peter Sculthorpe
Movement (for flute and piano) / Roger Smalley
Sonata (for solo flute) / Larry Sitsky

References

1988 albums